Jacques de Pierpont is a rock journalist from Belgium.

He works for RTBF at the radio station Classic 21 where he presented Hell's bells. He retired in March 2015.

External links 
 In La Libre essentielle 

Living people
Belgian journalists
Male journalists
Belgian radio journalists
Belgian radio presenters
Belgian music critics
Year of birth missing (living people)